Neotribalism, also known as modern tribalism or new tribalism, is a sociological concept which postulates that human beings have evolved to live in tribal society, as opposed to mass society, and thus will naturally form social networks constituting new tribes.

Sociological theory 
French sociologist Michel Maffesoli was perhaps the first to use the term neotribalism in a scholarly context in his 1988 book The Time of the Tribes. Maffesoli predicted that as the culture and institutions of modernism declined, societies would embrace nostalgia and look to the organizational principles of the distant past for guidance, and that therefore the post-modern era would be the era of neotribalism.

Work by researchers such as American political scientist Robert D. Putnam and a 2006 study by McPherson, Smith-Lovin and Brasiers published in the American Sociological Review seem to support at least the more moderate neotribalist arguments.

The notion of neotribalism is used in the field of consumer research under the label consumer tribes.

See also 
 Anarcho-primitivism
 Communalism
 Evolutionary psychology
 Kinism
 National-anarchism
 Tribalism

References 

Social theories
Subcultures
Syncretic political movements